Happiness is the Main Thing is a 1941 German comedy film directed by Theo Lingen and starring Heinz Rühmann, Hertha Feiler and Ida Wüst. It was shot at the Bavaria Studios in Munich and the Hostivar Studios in Prague. The film's sets were designed by the art directors Rudolf Pfenninger and Ludwig Reiber. It premiered at the Gloria-Palast in Berlin.

Synopsis
Rühmann plays a recently married employee of a large company.

Cast
 Heinz Rühmann as Axel Roth
 Hertha Feiler as Uschi Roth
 Ida Wüst as Frau Lind
 Hans Leibelt as Generaldirektor Arndt
 Arthur Wiesner as Standesbeamter
 Jane Tilden as Liselotte / Daisy
 Fritz Odemar as Generaldirektor Zimmermann
 Max Gülstorff as Bürovorsteher Binder
 Hilde Wagener as  Frau Bertyn
 Arthur Schröder as Lawyer Mohrig
 Annemarie Holtz as Betty Arndt
 Karl Etlinger as Juwelier
 Ernst G. Schiffner as Steuerbeamter
 Hans Paetsch as Unverheiratetet Kollege
 Hilde Sessak
 Theo Shall
 Hans Zesch-Ballot

References

Bibliography 
 Hake, Sabine. Popular Cinema of the Third Reich. University of Texas Press, 2001.

External links 
 

1941 films
Films of Nazi Germany
German comedy films
1941 comedy films
1940s German-language films
German black-and-white films
Bavaria Film films
Films shot at Bavaria Studios
1940s German films